Nunggubuyu may refer to:
Nunggubuyu people
Nunggubuyu language